Oraesia provocans, the provocative calpe, is a moth of the family Erebidae. The species was first described by Francis Walker in 1858. It is found throughout continental Africa, India and Sri Lanka.

Description
Its wingspan is about 48 mm. Antennae of the male are minutely ciliated. Forewings with angled outer margin. Male has dark palpi. Forewings with a silver streak on vein 2 before the oblique line. A silver streak found at apex and line on outer margin below apex. Female is much darker.

The larvae feed on Cissampelos species and Adenia gummifera.

References

Moths described in 1858
Calpinae